Aasayam ( Aim) is a 1993 Telugu-language political film, produced by A. M. Rathnam under the Sri Surya Movies banner and directed by A. Mohan Gandhi. It is a lady oriented movie with Vijayashanti playing the lead role and Jagapathi Babu in another important role  and music composed by Raj–Koti. The film won two Nandi Awards.

Plot
The film begins with political warfare in a state where a skirmish becomes active between Chief Minister & Home Minister Reddappa. Sarojini is a spirited and plucky student daughter of Collector Chakrapani. She is admired and endeared by her fellow collegian Suri Babu that always shields her against dangers. Chakrapani is a forthright candid who induces Sarojini to move in his footsteps. He also ostracized his wicked son Inspector Sagar. 

Once, Chakrapani exposes a scam committed by Home Minister. So, he is slain which is witnessed by Sarojini. Here, Sagar manipulates and cracks the case. Yet, Sarojini remains resolute and combats crime. But unbeknownst she grips the Home Minister where she is accused of attempted homicide and abuse. At that point, she gains great acclaim. Exploiting it, Chief Minister acquits and makes her contest as MLA in upcoming elections where she triumphs. At every level, Suri Babu stands in for her, and they are nuptials. Gradually, Sarojini dethrones the Home Minister by divulging his diabolic shade and receives his seat. 

Meanwhile, Manoj, CM’s son doublecrosses his father by jumbling with Home Minister and also slaughters a journalist. Then, unhesitantly, Sarojani apprehends Manoj. Moreover, she decides to produce all the pieces of evidence against the government before the Governor on eve of Independence Day. Thus, begrudged CM mingles with Home Minister, and they plot to assassinate Sarojini. During the event, CM is backstabbed by Home Minister whom Sarojini recuses and reforms. In that havoc, Suri Babu sacrifices his life while guarding Sarojini. At last, CM confesses his sin and entrusts the government to Sarojini. Finally, the movie ends with Sarojini proceeding forward with her public service.

Cast

 Vijayashanti as Sarojini
 Jagapati Babu as Suri Babu
 Srikanth as A Student
 C. S. Rao as Chief Minister
 Vijayakumar as Collector Chakrapani
 Devan as Home Minister Reddappa
 Tanikella Bharani as M.L.A.
 Paruchuri Venkateswara Rao as Srihari Rao
 Charan Raj as  Inspector Sagar
 Sudhakar as Manoj
 Babu Mohan as M. L. A. Yalamanda
 Narra Venkateswara Rao as Ananda Rao
 Vallabaneni Jaanardhan
 Kadambari Kiran as Shobhanadri
 Surya as Ramesh
 Vankayala Satyanarayana as Speaker
 Ironleg Sastri
 Vadivukkarasi as Kasthuri (Chakrapani's wife)
 Santhi as Shobha
 Dubbing Janaki
 Disco Shanti in item number
 Nirmalamma as Naga Ratnam
 Baby Sunayana as Sagar's daughter

Awards
Nandi Awards - 1993
Best Story Writer - Paruchuri Brothers
Best Supporting Actor - Paruchuri Venkateswara Rao

References

External links

1993 films
Indian political films
Films scored by Raj–Koti
1990s Telugu-language films
Films directed by A. Mohan Gandhi